Khairpur District is a district in the Pakistani province of Sindh in Sukkur Division. At the 2017 census, it was the fifth most populated district in the province after four districts of Karachi city, with 2.4 million inhabitants. The headquarters of the district is the city of Khairpur. The district is further divided into eight sub-districts: Khairpur Tehsil, Mirwah Tehsil, Kot Diji Tehsil, Kingri Tehsil,  Sobho Dero Tehsil, Gambat Tehsil, Faiz Ganj Tehsil and Nara Tehsil.

Location
Khairpur district is located between middle and northern Sindh. It is bounded on the north by Shikarpur District and Sukkur District, on the east by India, on the south by Sanghar District and Nawabshah District, and on the west by Larkana District, Naushahro Feroze District and Indus River. The revised area of the district is 15,910 km2.

Demographics
At the time of the 2017 census, Khairpur district had a population of 2,405,190, of which 1,240,254 were males and 1,164,826 females. The rural population was 1,628,184 (67.69%) and urban 777,006 (32.31%). The literacy rate is 49.15%: 62.08% for males and 35.49% for females.

The majority religion is Islam, with 97.16% of the population. Hinduism (including those from Scheduled Castes) is practiced by 2.76% of the population.

At the time of the 2017 census, 95.64% of the population spoke Sindhi and 1.55% Punjabi as their first language.

Politics

The National Assembly. 
The District of Khairpur is mapped into three constituencies at the national level. The constituencies include NA-208 Khairpur-I, NA-209 Khairpur-II, and NA-210 Khairpur-III.

Following is the list of the Member National Assemblies(MNAs) representing district in the National Assembly of Pakistan.

The Provincial Assembly 
The District of Khairpur is represented by the seven constituencies in the Provincial Assembly of Sindh.

Administration
It has 8 tehsils, 76 Union councils, 11 towns, 6800 Villages and total population 1546587 (Male 810448 and Female Population 736139) according to (Census) 1998.

The eight tehsils of the district are:
Faiz Ganj Tehsil
Gambat Tehsil
Khairpur Tehsil 
Kingri Tehsil 
Kot Diji Tehsil
Nara Tehsil
Sobho Dero Tehsil
Thari Mirwah Tehsil

The union councils are:	
UC No. 1	Tandu Masti
UC No. 2	Khan pur
UC No. 3	Machyoon
UC No. 4	Hajna Shah
UC No. 5	Shadi Shaheed
UC No. 6	Bugro
UC No. 7	Gujo 
UC No. 8	Shah Ladhani
UC No. 9	Mehr Ali
UC No. 10	Peer Mangion
UC No. 11	Shah Bhangio
UC No. 12	Ubhri
UC No. 13	Noor Pur
UC No. 14	Peer Badal
UC No. 15	Hadal Shah
UC No. 16	SadarJi Bhatyoon
UC No. 17	Manghanwari
UC No. 18	Rahooja Meer
UC No. 19	Mohial
UC No. 20	Kot Meer Muhammad
UC No. 21	Ulra
UC No. 22	Wada Mahesar
UC No. 23	Drib Mehar Shah
UC No. 24	Kolab Jial 
UC No. 25	Laal Bakhsh Kandhro
UC No. 26	Bhonbhatpur
UC No. 27	Peer Hayat Shah
UC No. 28	Sami
UC No. 29	Mera
UC No. 30	Madd
UC No. 31	Sagyoon
UC No. 32	Haji Abdul Kareem Kharal
UC No. 33	Sitharja Bala
UC No. 34	Gadeji
UC No. 35	Rasool Abad
UC No. 36	Daraza Sharif
UC No. 37	Kamal Dero
UC No. 38	Khemtia
UC No. 39	Jado Wahan 
UC No. 40	Belharo
UC No. 41	Ali Muhammad Khan Sarohi abad / Village Ali Bakhsh Sarohi
UC No. 42	Razi Dero Kacho
UC No. 43	Munawarabad
UC No. 44	Ripri
UC No. 45	Shaheed Naseem Ahmed Kharal / Kharalabad
UC No. 46	Raheem Bakhsh was an
UC No. 47	Jiskani
UC No. 48	Fateh Pur
UC No. 49	Jhando Mashaikh
UC No. 50	Ali Muhammad Machi
UC No. 51	Talpur Wada
UC No. 52	Baphu
UC No. 53	Nasir Fakir
UC No. 54	Ustad Atta Muhammad Hami
UC No. 55	Muhabat wah
UC No. 56	Layari (HussainAbad)
UC No. 57	Goondariro
UC No. 58	Sohu
UC No. 59	Hindyari 
UC No. 60	Jaffar Khan Jalalani
UC No. 61	Saniso
UC No. 62	Mandan
UC No. 63	Tarko
UC No. 64	Kharirah
UC No. 65	Baqi Khan
UC No. 66	Mehar Veesar
UC No. 67	Deparja
UC No. 68	Talee
UC No. 69	Sabar Rind
UC No. 70	Moosan Shah
UC No. 71	Peer Budhro
UC No. 72	Akri
UC No. 73	Khushkhail
UC No. 74	Kandiyari
UC No. 75	Karam Khan Kubar / Rajper 
UC No. 76	Bhangu Behan
UC No. 77	Razaabad
UC No. 78	Kot Lalu 
UC No. 79	Punhal Rajper
UC No. 80	Umman Rajper
UC No. 81	Peer Abdul Qadir Shah
UC No. 82	Kot Jubo
UC No. 83	Dodo Faqeer Aradin (Ahsaanabad)
UC No. 84	Khenwari
UC No. 85	Tajjal Shareef
UC No. 86	Sikandarabad

List of Dehs
The following is a list of Khairpur District's dehs, organised by taluka:

 Khairpur Taluka (43 dehs)
 Aalipur
 Abad Jagir
 Atteri
 Baberloi
 Bhurgari
 Bindi Muhammad Panah
 Bugro
 Chaar Jagir
 Chhejro
 Danwaro
 Gujo
 Hajna Shah
 Jhaloji
 Keti Muhari
 Khairpur
 Khanpur
 Khariro
 Kouro Phulpoto
 Lalo Shedi
 Luqman
 Machyoon
 Mangi
 Mehar Ali
 Mitho Mari
 Nizamani
 Palh
 Paneero
 Panwari
 Phatt
 Phulwahan
 Pipri
 Pir Mangio
 Raina
 Shadi Shaheed
 Shah Bhangio
 Shah Ladhani
 Tando Masti
 Tando Nazar Ali
 Tando Nehal
 Therhi
 Ubhari
 Wassan
 Wisro Wahan
 Gambat Taluka (50 dehs)
 Agra
 Baharo Dero
 Baharo Katcho
 Belharo
 Belharo Katcho
 Dhandan
 Deh Kuria
 Dodo Bhutto
 Draza Chak-1
 Draza Chak-2
 Draza Chak-3
 Fato Sial
 Gambat
 Gangar
 Gigra Kalhora
 Golo Wahan
 Jado Wahan
 Jamra
 Kaleri
 Kamal Dero
 Keti Abhouro
 Keti Morio
 Keti Unar
 Khairo Dero
 Khemtia
 Khuhra
 Lakha
 Lal Kumbhar
 Mehro Pathan
 Miani
 Mujhid
 Nando Baharo
 Paleeja
 Paleja Kacho
 Phori
 Pir Esso
 Razi Dero
 Razi Dero Katcho
 Ripri
 Saidi Bala
 Saidi Lowor
 Sanhri
 Sarohi
 Satabo
 Shah Takio
 Sial Pathan
 Sial Pathan Kacho
 Sial Pathan/Agra Boring
 Tagar Chak-2
 Toori
 Wad Pagia
 Kingri Taluka (49 dehs)
 Abdullah Kalhoro
 Ahmed Pur
 Baharpur
 Bambho Khoruam
 Beli Chani
 Bhambho Dero
 Chachar
 Denal Shah
 Drib Rozi
 Fareedabad
 Fateh Ali Chandio
 Gahno Kalhoro
 Garhi
 Mori
 Gadhi
 Ghuriri
 Gumchi
 Kainchi
 Kanjan
 Katohar
 Keti Pandhi
 Keti Mehar
 Kingri
 Kolab Jail
 Langah
 Mangerji
 Manghanwari
 Mari
 Mian Khan
 Miano
 Mitho dero
 Mohil
 Noorpur
 Paki Khohi
 Pir Shahbazi
 Piryalo
 Qaim Kalhoro
 Rafique Mahesar
 Rahouja
 Rajo Dero
 Sadarji
 Saeed pur
 Saidi
 Sri Ghanwar Khan
 T. M. Hyder
 Ulra Chak 1
 Ulra Chak 2
 Ulra Chak 3
 Ulra Chak 4
 Kot Diji Taluka (53 dehs)
 Agha Hashim Shah
 Ali Muhammad Machhi
 Arab Machhi
 Arbani
 Babar
 Bago Dharo
 Baharo Lashari
 Bakho Lashari
 Bapho
 Chhudahu
 Chouniro
 Dadloo
 Dhukar
 Fateh Pur
 Goondariro
 Hussainabad
 Jahndo Mashaikh
 Jiskani
 Junna
 Kanasira
 Khuda Bux Hisbani
 Kot Diji
 Kotlu
 Layari
 Luhrani
 Malku Wahan
 Mehrano-1
 Mehrano-2
 Mir Khan Muhammad
 Mithan Fakir
 Mithri
 Muhammad Hajam
 Muhbat Wah
 Nagrija
 Naro Dhoro
 Nasir Fakir
 Nawab Wassan
 Nebahu Patta
 Noor Bozdar
 Panhwari
 Patta
 Pir Gudo
 Pir Misri
 Qaim Gopang
 Raban Rajper
 Rajpari
 Rind
 Shafi Muhammad Ujjan
 Sohu
 Sono Gopang
 Talpur Wada
 Tando Shah
 Wali Muhammad Bhatti
 Mirwah Taluka (55 dehs)
 Ahmed Ali Wah
 Allah Dino Amur
 Allah Wasayo Depar
 Bago Dhoro
 Bozdar
 Chutto Wandier
 Dato Dasti
 Deparja
 Dhedhano
 Faiz Muhammad Mojai
 Gabar
 Gahi Chakrani
 Gigro
 Habib Phull
 Halepota
 Hindyari
 Jalalani
 Jalbani
 Jangwaro
 Jeorge Ali Murad
 Kalro
 Kanchhi
 Kharirah
 Khuda Bux Kubar
 Mandan
 Maroro
 Matt
 Mengho Shar
 Mossan Shah
 Mothar
 Muhammad Ashabi
 Mureed Haji
 Nazim Shar
 Pirwasan
 Punihar
 Ranyah
 Sabar Rind
 Saindad Haji
 Saindad Machhi
 Saneso
 Sanjrani
 Sawri
 Seri
 Shah Nawaz
 Sher Khan Lund
 Soofai
 Sutyaro
 Tali
 Tando Mir Ali
 Tarko
 Telahu
 Thari
 Wagah
 Wali Dad Lund
 Waryam Wandier
 Nara Taluka (59 dehs)
 Ahsan Jaro
 Beewari
 Bewatoo
 Bhait Tharoji
 Bhaongiwari
 Bhit Bhonji
 Bhit Kindari
 Bux Ali Aradin
 Chachro
 Chhohar Shar
 Choondko-1
 Choondko-2
 Dadu
 Dandh Simmi
 Daoji
 Darbhoo
 Dedhano
 Dingari
 Dodiwari
 Geandhaou
 Ghulam Hussain
 Gogo
 Gulab Bhanbhro
 Idhoie
 Ilyas Wari
 Jhuryaro
 Jubo
 Kamaraho
 Katgarh
 Kathore
 Kharch
 Khenwari
 Kherap
 Kirari
 Kiri Aradin
 Klahoo
 Ladhou
 Laiwari
 Lemoo Rajpar
 Luck Turko
 Methari
 Muhammad Khan Bhurgari
 Nisrullah
 Pateji
 Patel pota
 Pharhiyaro
 Pir Bux Aradin
 Pir Bux Gaho
 Pir Ibu
 Razo Bhanbhro
 Sarhadano
 Saido
 Sami Pota
 Santarahoo
 Soomarwari
 Sorah
 Tahroji
 Taj Muhammad Mullo
 Tajal
 Faiz Ganj Taluka (59 dehs)
 Abdullah Hisbani
 Akri
 Akro
 Allah Warayo
 Amin Pato
 Anheeri
 Anoi
 Araro
 Aub
 Baseero
 Bather
 Bhangu Behan
 Budho Mullo
 Buo
 Cheena
 Chibherero
 Derah
 Dhundh
 Gadano
 Ghulam Nabi
 Hussain Shah
 Hussain Pato
 Izat Shar
 Jaffar Lashari
 Jakhereri
 Jalalji
 Kandiari
 Karam Khan
 Karoondi
 Khair Muhammad
 Khinyari
 Khuteero
 Kot Laloo
 Kup
 Lakhrand
 Mari
 Mehar Ali Unar
 Mitho Chang
 Moheja
 Mohib Shah
 Nangar Shah
 Nazar M. Behan
 New Laheero
 Nindhero
 Pacca Chang
 Palyo Lashari
 Paneeri
 Pario Mari
 Pholahri
 Prano Laheero
 Punhal Rajper
 Radhan Mashaikh
 Rattar
 Sahito
 Sijawal Rajper
 Tarai
 Uman
 Usman Mullo
 Wahleer
 Sobho Dero Taluka (45 dehs)
 Abdul Karim Kharal
 Bhellar
 Bhombhatpur
 Bindi Motayio
 Chutto Channo
 Gaddeji
 Gahno Bhagat
 Hingoreja
 Kazi Bhutta
 Keti Kanoori
 Keti Moosa Bughio
 Keti Noorpur
 Khalifa Huryah
 Kharal
 Kot Chandiko
 Larik
 Machhar
 Maddd
 Mangi Mari
 Mangnapota
 Meerak
 Mehnidero
 Mir Khan Shahani
 Niwaro
 Noor Pur Katcho
 Noor Pur Reyasat
 Pialo
 Pir Mashaikh
 Pir Taj Muhammad
 Pir Umar Shah
 Rahopota
 Ranipur
 Ranipur Road
 Rasoolabad
 Rukrani
 Sagyon
 Sahita
 Sami
 Setaerja Bala
 Setharja Lower
 Shah Awais
 Sobho Dero
 Thatti
 Tunia
 Watani

People from Khairpur District
 Pir Pagaro - President of Pakistan Muslim League (F)
 Sachal Sarmast - eighteenth-Century Sufi Poet
 Qaim Ali Shah - former Chief Minister of Sindh Province
 Ghous Ali Shah - former Defense Minister of Pakistan and Former Chief Minister of Sindh province
 Mir Ali Murad Talpur - former ruler of the princely state of Khairpur

References

Sources

External links
District of Khairpur
  http://www.nrb.gov.pk/lg_election/union.asp?

 
Districts of Sindh